The 2013 World Junior Curling Championships were held from February 28 to March 10 at the Ice Cube Curling Center in Sochi, Russia. Sochi is also scheduled to host the curling tournament at the 2014 Winter Olympics.

Men

Teams
The teams are listed as follows:

Round Robin Standings
Final Round Robin Standings

Round-robin results
All draw times are listed in Moscow Time (UTC+4).

Draw 1
Thursday, February 28, 9:00

Draw 2
Thursday, February 28, 19:30

Draw 3
Friday, March 1, 14:00

Draw 4
Saturday, March 2, 9:00

Draw 5
Saturday, March 2, 19:00

Draw 6
Sunday, March 3, 14:00

Draw 7
Monday, March 4, 9:00

Draw 8
Monday, March 4, 19:00

Draw 9
Tuesday, March 5, 14:00

Draw 10
Wednesday, March 6, 9:00

Draw 11
Wednesday, March 6, 19:00

Draw 12
Thursday, March 7, 13:00

Playoffs

1 vs. 2
Friday, March 8, 19:00

3 vs. 4
Friday, March 8, 19:00

Semifinal
Saturday, March 9, 19:00

Bronze-medal game
Sunday, March 9, 9:00

Gold-medal game
Sunday, March 9, 9:00

Women

Teams
The teams are listed as follows:

Round Robin Standings
Final Round Robin Standings

Round-robin results
All draw times are listed in Moscow Time (UTC+4).

Draw 1
Thursday, February 28, 14:00

Draw 2
Friday, March 1, 9:00

Draw 3
Friday, March 1, 19:00

Draw 4
Saturday, March 2, 14:00

Draw 5
Sunday, March 3, 9:00

Draw 6
Sunday, March 3, 19:00

Switzerland ran out of time in the tenth end, and conceded the game to the United States.

Draw 7
Monday, March 4, 14:00

Draw 8
Tuesday, March 5, 9:00

Draw 9
Tuesday, March 5, 19:00

Draw 10
Wednesday, March 6, 14:00

Draw 11
Thursday, March 7, 8:30

Draw 12
Thursday, March 7, 17:30

Tiebreakers
Friday, March 8, 14:00

Playoffs

1 vs. 2
Saturday, March 9, 12:00

3 vs. 4
Saturday, March 9, 12:00

Semifinal
Saturday, March 9, 19:00

Bronze-medal game
Sunday, March 9, 13:00

Gold-medal game
Sunday, March 9, 13:00

References

External links

World Junior Curling Championships
World Junior Curling Championships
International curling competitions hosted by Russia
World Junior Curling Championships
Sports competitions in Sochi
World Junior Curling
World Junior Curling
2013 in youth sport
21st century in Sochi
Curling